Labouré College of Healthcare is a private college specializing in nursing and healthcare education and located in Milton, Massachusetts. Founded in 1892, by the Daughters of Charity, it is the longest-running nursing education program in the Boston area. The college offers online and on-campus certificate, associate, and bachelor's degree programs. In 2013, the campus moved from Dorchester to Milton, Massachusetts.

History
Labouré was founded in 1892 as the Carney Hospital Training School for Nurses in South Boston. In 1949, the school merged with two other nursing schools run by the Daughters of Charity of St. Vincent de Paul: the St. John's School of Nursing in Lowell, Massachusetts and the St. Margaret's School of Nursing in Dorchester. They formed the Catherine Labouré School of Nursing, named for St. Catherine Labouré, in 1950. The new school opened in 1951 and moved to the site of the new Carney Hospital in Dorchester in 1954. In 1971, it was authorized to award degrees in Massachusetts and changed its name to the Catherine Labouré Junior College. Its name changed again in 1984 and in 1993, to Catherine Labouré College and then to simply Labouré College. In 1997, the college became part of the Caritas Christi Health Care system and its name was officially changed to Caritas Labouré College in 2005, then officially changed back to Labouré College in 2009.

Until 1997, the school was sponsored by the Daughters of Charity of St. Vincent de Paul. It was subsequently affiliated with Steward Health Care System, until 2013 when it disaffiliated.

Campus
In 2013, Labouré College relocated from Dorchester to its new campus at 303 Adams Street in Milton, Massachusetts, adjacent to Fontbonne Academy.

Academics
Labouré offers the Bachelor of Science degree in nursing (BSN) and the Associate of Science degree in nursing and in allied health programs. It was first accredited by the New England Association of Schools and Colleges (NEASC) in 1975 and gained accreditation under the NEASC Commission on Institutions of Higher Education (CIHE) in 2005.

Student life
Labouré is a commuter college, not a residential college. Most of its students are part-time. The average age is 31.

References

External links
 Official website

1892 establishments in Massachusetts
Catholic universities and colleges in Massachusetts
Educational institutions established in 1892
Universities and colleges in Boston